Dagun is a rural town and locality in the Gympie Region, Queensland, Australia.

It is one of a chain of towns in the Mary Valley also including Amamoor, Imbil, and Kandanga.

Geography
Amamoor Creek, a tributary of the Mary River, forms most of the eastern boundary. Mary Valley Road (State Route 51) passes through the eastern part of the locality from north to south. The Mary Valley Branch Railway passes through from north-east to south-east. Dagun railway station serves the town.

History
The town takes its name from the railway station, which was named on  22 January 1914, using an Aboriginal word meaning home camp.

The Dagun State School opened on 18 June 1924.

Dagun Post Office opened on 1 June 1925 (a receiving office had been open from 1920) and closed in 1975.

Heritage listings 
Dagun has the following heritage listings:

 39 Dagun Road: Dagun State School
 Kimlin Lane: Dagun Railway Station

Education 
Dagun State School is a government primary (Prep-6) school for boys and girls at 39 Dagun Road. In 2017, the school had an enrolment of 35 students with 5 teachers (3 full-time equivalent) and 6 non-teaching staff (3 full-time equivalent).

There is no secondary school in Dagun. The nearest government secondary schools are Mary Valley State College (to Year 10) in Imbil and Gympie State High School (to Year 12) in Gympie.

References

Further reading 

 

 

Towns in Queensland
Gympie Region
Localities in Queensland